Altiburus was a Roman–Berber town located in Africa Proconsularis. The town is tentatively identified with ruins at Henchir-Medeina (sometimes  Medét'na) (coordinates: 35 ° 52 '24 "N, 8 ° 47' 13" E) in modern Tunisia.

There are remains of :de:Altiburus (Titularbistum) such as the Forum, a theatre, and houses with mosaics. Some small pre-Roman finds have also been made.  In addition, numerous inscriptions in Punic and Latin were found. The site is currently being excavated by Catalan University of Barcelona.

In antiquity, Altiburus lay on the road from Carthage to Theveste, 35 km from El Kef on the confluence of two streams, north of the present location of Dawwar Awlad Gama. 
The name of the town comes from the Punic language and evidence of inscription there suggest a   strong Punic population element.
The Emperor Hadrian granted the town Municipium status.
The arrival of Islam took place in the end of the 7th century.

Bishopric
The Roman city was also the seat of an ancient bishopric which existed till the end of the 7th century The diocese was reestablished in 1933 as a titular episcopal see. Known bishops include: 
Victor fl393 (Donatist/Maximentius bishop)
Basilius fl397-418 (Catholic bishop)
Augustalis (Donatist Bishop and rival at the Council of Carthage to basilius)
Vindemius (Catholic bishop) fl484 at the Council of Huneric
Gerald Emmett Carter (1 Dec 1961 Appointed – Feb 17 1964 Appointed, Bishop of London, Ontario) 
Charles Borromeo wings (Sep 7 1968 Appointed – Jun 1 2004) 
Gerald Thomas Walsh (28 Jun 2004 Appointed -)

References

Roman towns and cities in Africa (Roman province)
Coloniae (Roman)
Populated places in Tunisia
Catholic titular sees in Africa